Mid-Air Thief is a pseudonymous South Korean folktronica musician. They have released two albums: Gongjoong Doduk (2015) and Crumbling (2018), the latter of which won Best Dance & Electronic Album at the 2019 Korean Music Awards.

Career 
Mid-Air Thief started their career in 2012 using the stage name Hyoo (휴). In 2015, the project changed its name to Gongjoong Doduk (공중도덕) and released its self-titled debut album, which was nominated for Best Modern Rock Album at the 2016 Korean Music Awards. Their name would change again to Mid Air Thief (공중도둑) after rappers Dok2 and The Quiett released a song called "공중도덕" as part of the 2016 South Korean reality competition show, Show Me the Money 5.

In 2018, Mid-Air Thief released their second album, Crumbling, which features vocals by South Korean singer Summer Soul. The album gained attention from online music communities. Crumbling was nominated for both Album of the Year and Best Dance & Electronic Album at the 2019 Korean Music Awards, and won Best Dance & Electronic Album.

In 2021, Mid-Air Thief contributed to the soundtrack for the anime series Sonny Boy.

In 2022, Mid-Air Thief released their third album, Flood Format (손을 모아), via their Bandcamp page and under the name Bird's Eye Batang (새눈바탕).

Discography

Studio albums

Awards and nominations

References

External links
 Mid-Air Thief on Bandcamp

South Korean folk rock musicians
South Korean electronic musicians
Korean Music Award winners
Topshelf Records artists
Anonymous artists